The Oberheim DSX is a pre-MIDI digital polyphonic sequencer. It operates using a proprietary parallel bus and was designed for use with the OB-X, OB-SX, OB-Xa and OB-8. Connection was via a heavy 1:1 cable, which plugged from the host DSX to the target synthesizer using a rear DB-37 connector. The DSX is capable of driving up to 16 voices concurrently. Sequences are stored in internal memory after power-off using static RAM which remains powered up from an internal NiCad battery.

The combination of Oberheim DSX, Oberheim DMX and either OB-8 or OB-Xa were marketed as the "Oberheim System".

Features

The DSX is capable of storing and sequencing over 6,000 events, over 10 songs of 10 patterns each. The DSX is also capable of also driving traditional analog synthesizers via its 8-channel CV/Gate interface. It's also possible to drive the DSX via an external clock.

Notable users

 Michael Beinhorn
 Trevor Horn
 Geddy Lee
 Mike Oldfield
 Steve Roach
 Sting

References

External links

Music sequencers
Oberheim synthesizers